La buona figliuola (The Good-Natured Girl or The Accomplish'd Maid), or La Cecchina (The girl from Cecchina), is an opera buffa in three acts by Niccolò Piccinni. The libretto, by Carlo Goldoni, is based on Samuel Richardson's novel Pamela; or, Virtue Rewarded. This was Piccinni's most successful Italian opera. There was a sequel entitled La buona figliuola maritata (1761) by the same composer and librettist. La buona figliuola supposta vedova by Gaetano Latilla followed in 1766.

Performance history
It was first performed at the Teatro delle Dame, Rome, on 6 February 1760 with an all-male cast. It was given in London at the King's Theatre on 25 November 1766 with Gaetano Guadagni, Savi, Lovattini, Morigi, Quercioli, Piatti, and Michele; and at Covent Garden in English as The Accomplish'd Maid on 3 December 1766. It was revived as La Cecchina (with alterations) on 7 February 1928 in Bari (the composer's native city), as part of a celebration of the bicentenary of Piccinni's birth.

This opera is said to have been performed by Jesuits in China in 1778, namely at the court of the Qianlong Emperor.

Roles

Synopsis
The marquis of Conchiglia has fallen in love with Cecchina, who is a maid. Shocked by the social impropriety of such a match, Cavaliere Armidoro, the fiancé of the marquis's sister, refuses to marry Lucinda. Distraught over losing the man she loves, Lucinda begs the marquis to stop seeing Cecchina. Meanwhile, Cecchina has several problems of her own, including Mengotto, a poor man who is infatuated with her and won't leave her alone, and Sandrina and Paoluccia, two jealous maids who try to cause as much trouble for Cecchina as they can. After many plot twists, the opera ends well when Tagliaferro, a German soldier, reveals that Cecchina is in fact the daughter of a German baron, which enables Cecchina to marry the Marchese without upsetting Armidoro.

Recordings

Piccinni: La Cecchina, ossia La buona figliuola – Orchestra Serenissima Pro Arte
Conductor: Bruno Campanella
Principal singers: Alessandra Ruffini, Bruno Pratico, Maria Angeles Peters, Gabriella Morigi, Giuseppe Morino
Recording date: 8 January 2002
Label: Nuova Era 7123/25 (3 cd)

Piccinni: La buona figliola – Orchestra del Teatro dell'Opera di Roma
Conductor: Gianluigi Gelmetti
Principal singers: Lucia Aliberti, Enzo Dara, Margherita Rinaldi, Emilia Raviglia, Ugo Benelli
Recording date: 4 February 1981
Label: Fonit Cetra CDC 95 (2 cd)

Piccinni: La Cecchina, ossia La buona figliuola – La Lyra di Anfione
Conductor: Vito Paternoster
Principal singers: Serena Farnocchia, Graziella Merrino, Danilo Formaggia, Eun Young Oh, Larissa Schmidt, Eugenia Pont-Burgoyne, Piero Terranova, Davude Pelissero
Recording date: 25 September 2001
Label: Bongiovanni GB 2293/94-2 (2 cd)

References
Notes

Sources

Hunter, Mary (1992). "Buona figliuola, La" in Sadie 1992, vol. 1, pp. 640–642.
Hunter, Mary (2001). "Piccinni: (1) Niccolò Piccinni. Works" (with James L. Jackman, Marita P. McClymonds, David Charlton) in Sadie 2001.
Loewenberg, Alfred (1978). Annals of Opera 1597–1940 (third edition, revised). Totowa, New Jersey: Rowman and Littlefield. .
Rushton, Julian (2001). "Niccolò Piccinni", pp. 673–676, in The New Penguin Opera Guide, edited by Amanda Holden. New York: Penguin Putnam. .
Sadie, Stanley, editor (1992). The New Grove Dictionary of Opera (4 volumes). London: Macmillan. .
Sadie, Stanley, editor (2001). The New Grove Dictionary of Music and Musicians, 2nd edition. London: Macmillan.  (hardcover),  (eBook), and Grove Music Online.
Warrack, John; West, Ewan (1992). The Oxford Dictionary of Opera New York: Oxford University Press. .

External links
 
 , performance by Northwestern University School of Music, 30 March 2007
 1760 libretto for Bergamo (Libretti der Musikgeschichtlichen Bibliothek des Deutschen Historischen Instituts in Rom)

Italian-language operas
Operas
Operas by Niccolò Piccinni
Libretti by Carlo Goldoni
Operas based on novels
Opera buffa
1760 operas